Michele Raffin is an American aviculturist, writer, and founder of Pandemonium Aviaries, a non-profit organization in Los Altos, California that is one of the largest exotic bird sanctuaries in the United States. Pandemonium Aviaries is now a leader in conservation breeding of exotic species for return to the wild.  The focus of the organization is on birds from New Guinea.  Among the important species that Pandemonium breeds and protects are the Crowned pigeons, the Nicobar pigeons, and the Green-naped pheasant pigeons.

Michele Raffin is a former venture capitalist in the Silicon Valley who obtained a degree in 1980s from Stanford Graduate School of Business, and founded Pandemonium in 1996. She has written three books, the most recent about her experiences with Pandemonium.  The Birds of Pandemonium has received the following honors:
 Selected for the Barnes & Noble Discover Great New Writers Program
 Included in Amazon's Non-fiction Best Books of the Month (October 2014)
 IndieBound's Next Great Reads List (November 2014 )
 Entertainment Weekly's MUST List (October 2014)
 Reading Group Choices New & Emerging Writers List
 Audubon Sponsored Contest
 AARP recommended as Holiday Gift (November 2014)
 Mentioned in the National Book Critics Circle
 First on Kitsap Regional Library's list of "Books to Inspire"

Michele Raffin is an Olympic weightlifter.  She won a gold medal in the 2011 masters Pan American Games, and broke 9 records.

Books

References

External links
Pandemonium Aviaries

Living people
Stanford Graduate School of Business alumni
American conservationists
Aviculture
Animal breeders
People from Los Altos, California
Activists from California
Year of birth missing (living people)